Gone Pone also Tat Ka Tho Gone Pone(born 31 August) is  one of most popular and
Myanmar Academy Award winning Burmese  actress and presenter.  She won her first Best Supporting Actress  Academy Award in 2015 . She has acted in over 50 films.

Personal life
Gone married Myat Htun Shwe.

Awards and nominations

References

Living people
21st-century Burmese actresses
Year of birth missing (living people)
Burmese film actresses